Vitebsk District (Vitebsk Raion)  is a district of Belarus in Vitebsk Region.

The administrative center of the district is the city of Vitebsk, administratively separated from the district. The most populated town of the district itself is Ruba.

Geography
Situated in the eastern side of its Voblast and crossed by the Vitba river; Vitebsk District borders, from north to south, with the districts of Haradok, Shumilina, Beshankovichy, Syanno and Liozna. In the eastern side it borders with the Russian oblasts, from south to north, of Smolensk and Pskov.

Subdivision
The district is divided into 8 rural councils (selsoviets) and 45 municipalities (including Vitebsk).

Rural councils

Municipalities
 Vidzy

Notable residents 

Alexander Rypinski (1809, Kukaviačyna estate - 1886), Belarusian and Polish poet, translator and folklorist, participant in the November Uprising

References

External links

Districts of Vitebsk Region